Sagebrush steppe is a type of shrub-steppe, a plant community characterized by the presence of shrubs, and usually dominated by sagebrush, any of several species in the genus Artemisia. This ecosystem is found in the Intermountain West in the United States.

The most common sagebrush species in the sagebrush steppe in most areas is big sagebrush (Artemisia tridentata). Others include three-tip sagebrush (Artemisia tripartita) and low sagebrush (Artemisia arbuscula). Sagebrush is found alongside many species of grasses.

Sagebrush steppe is a diverse habitat, with more than 350 recorded vertebrate species. It is also open rangeland for livestock, a recreation area, and a source of water in otherwise arid regions. It is key habitat for declining flora and fauna species, such as greater sage-grouse (Centrocercus urophasianus) and pygmy rabbit (Brachylagus idahoensis).

Sagebrush steppe is a threatened ecosystem in many regions. It was once very widespread in the regions that form the Intermountain West, such as the Great Basin and Colorado Plateau. It has become fragmented and degraded by a number of forces. Steppe has been overgrown with introduced species and has changed to an ecosystem resembling pine and juniper woodland. This has changed the fire regime of the landscape, increasing fuel loads and increasing the chance of unnaturally severe wildfires. Cheatgrass (Bromus tectorum) is also an important introduced plant species that increases fire risk in this ecosystem.
 Other forces leading to these habitat changes include fire suppression and overgrazing of livestock. Besides severe fire, consequences of the breakdown of sagebrush steppe include increased erosion of the land and sedimentation in local waterways, decreased water quality, decreased quality of forage available for livestock, and degradation of habitat for wildlife and game animals.

References

External links 
 
 

Deserts and xeric shrublands in the United States
Temperate grasslands, savannas, and shrublands in the United States
Plant communities of the Western United States
Plant communities of California

 Sagebrush steppe

Grasslands of Canada
Grasslands of the United States
Grasslands of California
Ecoregions of the United States
Plants by habitat
Basin and Range Province